The Arcadians is a 1927 British comedy film directed by Victor Saville (his directorial debut), and starring Ben Blue, Jeanne De Casalis and Vesta Sylva. It is a silent adaptation of the musical The Arcadians. It is on the BFI 75 Most Wanted list of missing films, but the British Film Institute has reported that an "incomplete and deteriorating nitrate print ... was apparently viewed prior to July 2008". It was made at the Lime Grove Studios in Shepherd's Bush.

Cast
 Ben Blue as Simplicitas Smith
 Jeanne De Casalis as Mrs. Smith
 Vesta Sylva as Eileen Cavanaugh
 John Longden as Jack Meadows
 Gibb McLaughlin as Peter Doody
 Humberston Wright as Sir George Paddock
 Cyril McLaglen as The Crook
 Doris Bransgrove as Sombra
 Nancy Rigg as Chrysea
 Phyllis Calvert as Young girl

References

Bibliography
 Low, Rachael. History of the British Film, 1918-1929. George Allen & Unwin, 1971.

External links
BFI 75 Most Wanted entry, with extensive notes

1927 films
1927 comedy films
British comedy films
British silent feature films
Films directed by Victor Saville
Films shot at Lime Grove Studios
British black-and-white films
Films produced by Victor Saville
Films with screenplays by Victor Saville
1920s English-language films
1920s British films
Silent comedy films